The Order of Friendship is a state decoration of the Russian Federation.

Order of Friendship may also refer to:
 Order of Friendship (Armenia)
 Dostlug Order or the Order of Friendship, of the Republic of Azerbaijan
 Order of Friendship (China)
 Order of Friendship (Kazakhstan), also known as the Order Dostyk
 Order of Friendship (North Korea)
 Order of Friendship of Peoples, of the Soviet Union
Order of the Friendship of Peoples, of Belarus

See also 
 Friendship Award (China)
 Friendship Medal (Cuba)
 Friendship Order, of Vietnam